Manarat Dhaka International School & College (MDIC) (from the word منارة manа̄rat "beacon") is a trust-owned school in Gulshan, Dhaka, Bangladesh. It offers British Curriculum from play-group to advanced level, offering GCE O-Level and GCE A-Level examinations, held under the University of Cambridge. Manarat emphasizes moral teachings and etiquette more than textbook knowledge. Manarat encourages its students to learn Arabic from a very young age (upto grade 6). It also stresses Islamic teachings and inspires students to strengthen their iman.

The current principal of the school is Brig. Gen (Retd) Md Mehdi Hassan Pramanik, psc and the school's vice principals are Ms. Fatima Jemaima Rahman and Mr. Mohammad Farooque.

Due to the COVID-19 pandemic, the school was closed and classes & exams were taken through the online platform Zoom between March 2020 and March 2022.

History
The Manarat trust established an English medium kindergarten school in 1979, named Manarat Dacca. In 1985 the school was renamed as Manarat Dhaka International School. With gradual advancement of the students in higher classes and with the launch of an English medium HSC Level program, the name of the school was changed to Manarat Dhaka International College in 1991.

It was a time when English medium education was very rare in the country. A group of Islamic scholars under the guidance of the late Sheikh Fouad Abdulhameed Alkhateeb, the ambassador of the Kingdom of Saudi Arabia in Bangladesh, strongly felt the necessity of establishing an educational institution where eternal values of Islam could be taught along with modern education. With that view in mind, Manarat started its journey as an English medium institution under the curriculum of Cambridge International Examinations London with Islamic values at its bastion.

Campus
The college is located in one of the quieter and more scenic parts of Gulshan, on the edge of Gulshan Lake. Although started in a hired house, it now owns three multi storied buildings and two big play grounds in front on an area of 2.7 acres of land. The campus is located in Gulshan, Plot - CEN 16, Road - 104 with 3500 active students and 250 teaching staff and 150 admin staff. The school offers two shifts: Morning shift and Day shift. In grade 5, the Day shift ends and all students start attending the Morning shift. Two of the buildings, which hosts girls from every grade and boys below grade 3, are connected directly to each other and face one of the play grounds, with one of them being connected to the third building (with the other play ground), where boys from grade 3 and onwards are hosted, as well. The school holds an assembly on Sunday and Wednesday.

Activities

Debate
The Manarat Association of Debaters has hosted and participated in many competitions at home and abroad. This accomplished debating association has promoted Bangladesh by becoming runners-up in the SAARC Debate Championship in New Delhi in 2008. Members of the debating team also represented Bangladesh in the 1st World's Championship Debate Competition in 2006 at Wales, United Kingdom and in the 2nd World's Championship Debate Competition in Seoul, South Korea.

In the year 2007, MDIC ranked 2nd in the Bangladesh Debate Council's 3rd Pre-Worlds Ranking. Manarat holds the top position under "School and College Ranking – English" category.

Most recently, MDIC became semi-finalists at the Asian Schools Debate Championship 2018, held in Thailand.

Sports
Manarat regularly arranges and participates in various sporting events. The college hosted the MDIC Cup Football-2018 with teams from 18 English medium schools. The Manarites U-19 team were crowned 'Champions' and the U-14 Manarites were runners-up for their competition.

The Manarite football team also participated in the Gothia Cup-2016 held in China and Team Manarat continued to playoff B after reaching 3rd place in Group 4. In the playoff they made it to semi-finals.

MSWA (Manarat Student Welfare Association)
MSWA is a student organization which aims to help the underprivileged each year by raising funds from students. It was founded by grade 5 students and has so far been involved in a number of projects, from distributing clothes in winter to helping in the education of primary school children in Dhaka.

Principals
 Shamsunnahar Nizami
 Colonel (Retd) Ashraf al Deen
 Brig. Gen (Retd) Md Mehdi Hassan Pramanik

Notable alumni
 Nafees Bin Zafar, software engineer, first Bangladeshi to win an Oscar

References

External links
 

Cambridge schools in Bangladesh
Schools in Dhaka District
1979 establishments in Bangladesh
Educational institutions established in 1979